Eugene C. Eppley (April 8, 1884 – October 14, 1958) also known as Gene, was a hotel magnate in Omaha, Nebraska. Eppley is credited with single-handedly building one of the most successful hotel empires, by the 1950s the largest privately owned hotel chain in the United States.

Career

Born in Akron, Ohio, Eppley graduated from the Culver Military Academy in Indiana in 1901.  At the age of 19, he bought his first property, the McKinley Hotel in Canton, Ohio.  At age 33, in 1917, he formed the Eppley Hotel Company.  At its peak in the 1950s, the Eppley Hotel Company owned 22 hotels in six states. Eppley sold the company to Sheraton Hotels in 1956 for $30 million (equivalent to $ million in ).

Among many activities, he was a director of Sheraton Hotels, Mid-Continent Airlines, and the Mount Rushmore Foundation.

After purchasing the Hotel Fontenelle in downtown Omaha in 1920, Eppley lived at his flagship until his death in 1958.

"He fought hard and held his own... and success was prompted by the love of the game.  He was acquisitive and altruistic, proud and modest, but beneath it all humble and compassionate.  His life seemed a struggle to keep his soft side from showing.  He taught and inspired and disciplined... but exacted more of himself than any other.  He was an organizer, leader, teacher, fighter, talker and giver. All of his facets added up to a rather heroic figure."

Philanthropy

Eppley was a renowned philanthropist, who gave primarily to educational, civic and medical research causes in the Midwestern United States and especially in Omaha. He was active in Omaha's social club Knights of Ak-Sar-Ben, which supported local philanthropy and was elected the King of the Court of Ak-Sar-Ben in 1932.

In an unusual event, in 1955 Eppley through his hotel company donated food to the nuclear test experiment conducted with civilian witnesses, known as Operation Cue.  His and other private efforts were meant to demonstrate the ability of companies to ship and distribute food for "survivors" of a nuclear blast. Many witnesses were involved with civil defense organizations.

Eppley also personally commissioned paintings by artist Grant Wood. He commissioned the well-known "Fruits of Iowa" grouping in 1932, for murals for four of his hotels in Midwestern cities.  Several of the paintings of this series are now housed at Coe College in Iowa.

Publications about Eppley
 Dalstrom, H.A. (1969) Eugene C. Eppley: his life and legacy. Lincoln, NE: Johnsen Publishing Company.
 Dalstrom, H.A. "Eugene C. Eppley: His Life and Legacy," The Journal of American History. 57;2. September 1970. pp. 466–468.

See also

 History of Omaha
 The Reach of Eugene Eppley's Generosity

References

1884 births
1958 deaths
20th-century American businesspeople
20th-century American philanthropists
American hoteliers
businesspeople from Akron, Ohio
businesspeople from Omaha, Nebraska
Culver Academies alumni